Lionelo Patiño (1 June 1920 – 4 June 1987) was a Peruvian athlete. He competed in the men's shot put at the 1948 Summer Olympics.

References

External links
 

1920 births
1987 deaths
Athletes (track and field) at the 1948 Summer Olympics
Peruvian male shot putters
Olympic athletes of Peru
Place of birth missing
20th-century Peruvian people